The Yegeruqway (Russian: Егерукаевцы, Yegerukaevtsy) were one of the twelve major Circassian tribes, representing one of the twelve stars on the green-and-gold Circassian flag. There is also a small town with a form of the same name Egerukhay (Russian: Егерухай, Yegerukhaj) in the Koshekhablsky District, Adygea, Russia.

See also

Other Adyghe tribes:
 Abzakh
 Besleney
 Bzhedug
 Hatuqwai
 Kabardian
 Mamkhegh
 Natukhai
 Shapsug
 Temirgoy
 Ubykh
 Zhaney

References

Circassian tribes
Historical ethnic groups of Russia
Adygea